Iglesia de Santo Domingo is a church in Oviedo, region of Asturias, Spain. It was established in 1518.

See also
Asturian art
Catholic Church in Spain

References

Roman Catholic churches completed in 1518
16th-century Roman Catholic church buildings in Spain
Roman Catholic churches in Oviedo
Bien de Interés Cultural landmarks in Asturias